is a railway station in the city of  Noda, Chiba, Japan, operated by the private railway operator Tōbu Railway. The station is numbered "TD-18".

Lines

Station layout
The station consists of two opposed side platforms serving two tracks, connected to the station building by a footbridge.

Platforms

Adjacent stations

History
Umesato Station was opened on 9 May 1911. A new station building was completed in May 2007.

Passenger statistics
In fiscal 2018, the station was used by an average of 17,375 passengers daily.

Surrounding area
 
Nambu Industrial Park
Noda South Community Center

References

External links

  Tōbu Railway Station information

Railway stations in Japan opened in 1911
Railway stations in Chiba Prefecture
Tobu Noda Line
Stations of Tobu Railway
Noda, Chiba